The Plain of Flanders (fr: Plaine de Flandre or plaine flamande) is a low-lying plain bordering the North Sea. It is part of the Low Countries, and the North European Plain. It extends through the territories of Northern France and Belgium. It has two main sections : Maritime Flanders and Interior Flanders. The coastal plain consists mainly of sand dunes and polders.

It is a feature of the Flanders Basin (fr: Bassin de Flandre), which is separated from the Parisian Basin by the Hills of Artois.

It is a formation dating the Cenozoic era.

Maritime Flanders also refers to the French Westhoek region. It refers more specifically to the Blootland (Dutch for "naked land") or the Maritime Plain (French: Plaine maritime) including Dunkirk, Bourbourg, Bergues and Hondschoote.

See also 
 Flanders
 Geography of Belgium

References 

 La Flandre: étude géographique de la plaine flamande en France, Belgique et Hollande. R Blanchard, 1906
 Les changements du niveau de la mer dans la plaine maritime flamande pendant l'Holocene. R Tavernier, F Moormann, Geol. Mijnbouw, 1954

Plains of France
Landforms of Flanders